Urnshausen is a village and a former municipality in the Wartburgkreis district of Thuringia, Germany. Since 1 January 2019, it is part of the municipality Dermbach.

References

Wartburgkreis
Grand Duchy of Saxe-Weimar-Eisenach
Former municipalities in Thuringia